Keith Littlewood Johnson (15 February 1897 – 1960) was a Singaporean sailor. He competed in the Dragon event at the 1956 Summer Olympics.

References

External links
 

1897 births
1960 deaths
Singaporean male sailors (sport)
Olympic sailors of Singapore
Sailors at the 1956 Summer Olympics – Dragon